Agaricus phaeolepidotus is a species of fungus in the family Agaricaceae. A European species, the agaric was first described scientifically in 1952 by F.H.Møller.

See also

 List of Agaricus species

References

External links

phaeolepidotus
Fungi described in 1952
Fungi of Europe